Giulio Cisari (7 May 1892 – 28 March 1979) was an Italian painter. His work was part of the painting event in the art competition at the 1936 Summer Olympics.

References

1892 births
1979 deaths
20th-century Italian painters
20th-century Italian male artists
Italian male painters
Olympic competitors in art competitions
People from Como